Bluebonnet Electric Cooperative is an electric utility cooperative headquartered in Bastrop, Texas. Founded in 1939, Bluebonnet is one of Texas’ oldest electric cooperatives.

External links
 Bluebonnet Electric Cooperative Website

Companies based in Texas
Electric cooperatives in Texas
Austin County, Texas
Bastrop County, Texas
Burleson County, Texas
Caldwell County, Texas
Colorado County, Texas
Fayette County, Texas
Gonzales County, Texas
Guadalupe County, Texas
Hays County, Texas
Lee County, Texas
Milam County, Texas
Travis County, Texas
Washington County, Texas
Williamson County, Texas